Václav Klaus Institute is a Think tank based in the Czech Republic. The insitutue was established by Václav Klaus when his term as President of the Czech Republic ended and was inspired by the libraries of former American presidents. Other people involved with the institute are Jiří Weigl and Václav Klaus' sons. The institute was originally set up to serve as the Václav Klaus Library. It is financially supported by Petr Kellner.

The institute is closely associated with many prominent politicians of the Civic Democratic Party, including Jan Skopeček and Václav Klaus Jr. The institute itself is critical to the current Civic Democratic leader Petr Fiala.

Foundation
The institute was established in March 2012, one year before the end of Klaus' second term as president. Jiří Weigl said that the institute was set up so that Klaus could join when it was fully functional.

See also
 Klausism
 Center for Civic Freedoms

References

External links
Official website

Václav Klaus
Think tanks based in the Czech Republic
2012 establishments in the Czech Republic